Nishihara Station is a HRT station on Astram Line, located in 8-34-1, Nishihara, Asaminami-ku, Hiroshima.

Platforms

Connections
█ Astram Line
●Gion-shinbashi-kita — ●Nishihara — ●Nakasuji

Around station
Japan National Route 54 (Gion Shindo)
Gion Hara Post Office
Asaminami Post Office
Hiroshima Municipal Hara Elementary School

History
Opened on August 20, 1994.

See also
Astram Line
Hiroshima Rapid Transit

References 

Nishihara Station